Xuanren may refer to:

Xuanren Temple, a Taoist temple in Beijing, China
Duan Yu (1083–1176), Dali monarch, posthumous name Emperor Xuanren